Combined Task Force 150 (CTF-150) is a multinational coalition naval task force working under the 34-nation coalition of Combined Maritime Forces and is based in Bahrain established to monitor, board, inspect, and stop suspect shipping to pursue the "Global War on Terrorism" and in the Horn of Africa region (HOA) includes operations in the North Arabia Sea to support operations in the Indian Ocean. These activities are referred to as Maritime Security Operations (MSO).

Countries presently contributing to CTF-150 include Australia, Canada, Denmark, France, Pakistan, Japan, Germany, the United Kingdom and the United States. Other nations who have participated include Italy, India, Malaysia, Netherlands, New Zealand, Portugal, Singapore, Spain, Thailand and Turkey. The command of the task force rotates among the different participating navies, with commands usually lasting between four and six months. The task force usually comprises 14 or 15 ships. CTF-150 is coordinated by the Combined Maritime Forces (CMF), a 33-nation coalition operating from the US Navy base in Manama, Bahrain.

Gulf War 1990-1991 
After arrival in-theatre in late 1990, Vice Admiral Henry H. Mauz "retained the Middle East Force, designated CTG 150.1 [Commander Task Group 150.1], for most warfighting functions inside the Persian Gulf. Under this hat, Rear Admiral [William M. "Bill"] Fogarty would control only the half-dozen ships or so of the Middle East Force, augmented by the battleship Wisconsin when it arrived. Under a second hat, CTG 150.2, Fogarty would be the commander of the U.S. Maritime Interception Force. For this job, his authority would extend outside the Persian Gulf to ships operating in the North Arabian Sea and Red Sea, but only for interception operations." The CVBGs in the North Arabian Sea and Red Sea were designated Task Groups 150.4 and 150.5 respectively; the Amphibious and Landing Forces were CTG 150.6 and CTG 150.8 (Major General Jenkins). Rear Admiral Stephen S. Clarey was Commander U.S. Maritime Prepositioning Force, Commander Task Group 150.7 (CTG 150.7), with the equipment for the U.S. Marine Corps aboard. After the ships had disembarked the Marine equipment in Saudi Arabia, CTG 150.7 was disestablished on 12 September 1990.

From 1 January 1991, Commander Task Force 150 was Vice Admiral Henry H. Mauz, Jr. himself.

2002–2005 
Before 11 September 2001, Task Force 150 was a U.S. Navy formation serving as part of U.S. Naval Forces Central Command. After 11 September, it became a patrol force in the Horn of Africa region. On 5 May 2002, command of the force was handed over from the United States to Germany. The German Defence Ministry announced in Berlin that day that the leadership of the Task Force, supported by five nations, was to be handed over from Captain Frothingham (U.S. Navy) to German Admiral Gottfried Hoch.

On 9 December 2002, the  intercepted and boarded the freighter So San, several hundred miles southeast of Yemen at the request of the U.S. government as part of Operation Enduring Freedom. So San, sailing without a flag, attempted evasive action, so Navarra after firing four warning shots into the water at the bow of the ship and rifle fire on the ship's hull, getting no answer, fired on a cable crossing So San from bow to stern to remove obstacles and proceeded to approach it from a helicopter. The ship from North Korea was carrying a cargo of 15 Scud missiles, 15 conventional warheads with 250 kg of high explosive, 23 fuel tanks of nitric acid and 85 drums of chemicals. The freighter was handed over to the United States Navy. Yemen subsequently reported that the cargo belonged to them and protested against the interception, and as international law did not prohibit Yemen from purchasing the missiles the ship was released to proceed to Yemen.

On 20 December 2002, a meeting was held aboard  with military leaders from Djibouti regarding the Combined Joint Task Force - Horn of Africa. At the time, CTF-150 was commanded by Spanish Rear Admiral Juan Moreno, and comprised ships from France, Spain, Germany, the United Kingdom and United States.

In January 2003, the task force held a visit, board, search and seizure (VBSS) exercise involving the following vessels:

 Spain: Navarra (flagship, frigate)
 United States: USS Mount Whitney – (command ship)
 Germany:  (frigate), Rhön (tanker)
 Japan: JMSDF  JDS Samidare (destroyer),  (AEGIS destroyer),  (replenishment oiler)

On 8 June 2005, CTF-150, under the command of Royal Navy Commodore Tony Rix, successfully conducted the boarding of the vessel Safari in international waters, leading to the seizure of 2.3 tons of hashish. The French  frigate  performed the boarding.

On 17 August 2005, French Vice Admiral Jacques Mazars replaced Royal Navy Commodore Tony Rix as commander of CTF-150. At the time, it comprised ships of Italy, France, Germany, Pakistan, Canada, the United Kingdom and United States.

2006–2008: Operations off Somalia

Anti-piracy operations 

The CTF-150 has been engaged in anti-piracy operations in Somalia in parallel to other independent anti-piracy operations by countries such as China, Iran, India and Russia.

On 22 January 2006  captured a suspected pirate vessel in the Indian Ocean as part of an ongoing effort to help maintain law and order in the region.

In the action of 18 March 2006, two United States Navy ships were attacked by Somali pirates during an opposed boarding. In the ensuing gun battle, all the pirates were either killed or captured.

On 4 April 2006, the South Korean fishing vessel MV Dong Won reported it had come under rocket attack off the coast of Somalia. Immediately two ships from the task force, the Dutch frigate  and the U.S. guided-missile destroyer  responded. However, the pirates had already hijacked the vessel and reached Somali territorial waters after threatening the captured crew members.

On 24 April 2006, RAdm. Shahid Iqbal of Pakistan Navy relieved Dutch Commodore Hank Ort and assumed command of the Force.

On 22 August 2006, RAdm. Iqbal was relieved by German Rear Admiral Heinrich Lange.

In December 2006, Lange passed control to Royal Navy Commodore Bruce Williams.

In March 2007, the Dutch frigate  deployed to the waters of the Horn of Africa, as part of CTF-150, and in response to a request from the United Nations World Food Programme, against piracy off the Somali coast.

The CTF-150 established the Maritime Security Patrol Area on 22 August 2008, through a narrow corridor within the Gulf of Aden aimed at deterring attack and hijacking of ships seeking safe passage through the zone.

Also in August 2008, the Danish command & support ship  deployed to join and lead CTF 150 for a 6-month tour. On 17 September 2008, the Danish ship captured 10 pirates in two small ships. The pirates were in possession of ladders and other implements with which to board ships, as well as rocket launchers, machine pistols, and grenades. After consulting with the Danish Ministry of Justice and other task force members, it was determined by the Danish Ministry of Foreign Affairs that the pirates could only be prosecuted in Denmark, partly because the pirates would have faced the death penalty in the nearby states, and Danish law prohibits extraditing criminals when they might face the death penalty. Eventually, the pirates were freed, since the Danish authorities were concerned that it would be difficult to deport them back to Somalia once their sentences were served. The pirates were allowed to keep their ships, though not their weapons.

The craft from Somalia was reported to hold rocket-propelled grenades and AK-47 assault rifles, and to have been adrift for several days. Also per the report, Absalon took the sailors and weapons aboard, sank the craft, and turned the sailors over to the Yemen coast guard. Absalon, according to The New York Times report, "was deployed in the Gulf of Aden [in] September ['08] as part of an international effort to curb piracy." part of Combined Task Force 150.

Interdiction 

Throughout 2006, the Somali Civil War continued to escalate. During this time, the task force conducted normal operations in the Indian Ocean. By early 2007 it became actively involved in providing a maritime cordon to prevent the escape of members of Al Qaeda suspected of being embedded within the ranks of the Islamic Courts Union (ICU).

Open warfare broke out between Ethiopian and the ICU forces on 20 December 2006, but until 2 January 2007 there had been no request by the Ethiopian or Somali military for CTF-150 to take action. On that day, the aim of the patrols shifted to "...stop SICC leaders or foreign militant supporters escaping".

On 4 January 2008 ships of the task force began performing Visit, Board, Search, and Seizure (VBSS) missions, boarding fishing boats (dhows) and oil tankers passing near the Somali coast. Commodore Bruce Williams of the Royal Navy led the task force at this time.

2014–2017 
 seized  of heroin from a dhow in the northern Arabian Sea in May 2014. Then in July 2014 HMAS Darwin intercepted a further  of hashish on a dhow in the Indian Ocean.

, a Type 45 Royal Navy destroyer, seized over a ton of hashish from a dhow off Oman in June 2016.

In late April 2017, the  seized  of heroin from two dhows. In May 2017, a Type 23 British frigate, stopped and searched a fishing boat in the Indian Ocean.

Command history

See also 
 Combined Task Force 151
 Combined Task Force 152
 Operation Active Endeavour
 Operation Atalanta

References

External links 

 
 CTF-150: Maritime Security

Counterterrorism in the United States
Multinational units and formations
Naval task forces
War on terror
Piracy in Somalia
Military operations involving India
Naval operations involving Pakistan
Anti-piracy